The 2020–21 season was the 119th season of competitive association football in Spain.

National teams

Spain national football team

Friendlies

UEFA Nations League

Group 4

2022 FIFA World Cup qualification

Group B

UEFA Euro 2020

Group E

Knockout phase

Spain national under-23 football team

Summer Olympics 

Due to the COVID-19 pandemic, the games have been postponed to the summer of 2021. However, their official name remains 2020 Summer Olympics with the rescheduled 2021 dates have yet to be announced.

Spain women's national football team

Friendlies

UEFA Women's Euro 2021

Group D

UEFA competitions

UEFA Super Cup

UEFA Champions League

Group stage

Group A

Group B

Group E

Group G

Knockout phase

Round of 16 

|}

Quarter-finals

|}

Semi-finals

|}

UEFA Europa League

UEFA Europa League qualifying phase and play-off round

Second qualifying round

|}

Third qualifying round 

|}

Play-off round

|}

Group stage

Group E

Group F

Group I

Knockout phase

Round of 32

|}

Round of 16

|}

Quarter-finals

|}

Semi-finals

}

|}

Final

UEFA Youth League

On 17 February 2021, the UEFA Executive Committee cancelled the tournament.

UEFA Champions League Path

|}

Domestic Champions Path

|}

UEFA Women's Champions League

Knockout phase

Round of 32

|}

Round of 16

|}

Quarter-finals

|}

Semi-finals

|}

Final

Men's football

League season

La Liga

Segunda División

Segunda División B

Cup competitions

Copa del Rey

2020 Copa del Rey Final

The final was supposed to be played on 18 April 2020, but was postponed due to the COVID-19 pandemic.

2020–21 Copa del Rey

Final

Supercopa de España 

The Supercopa was played among four teams: 2019–20 La Liga winners and runners-up Real Madrid and Barcelona, and 2019–20 Copa del Rey finalists Athletic Bilbao and Real Sociedad.

Final

Copa Federación de España

Women's football

League season

Primera División

Segunda División

Cup competitions

Copa de la Reina

Supercopa de España

Final

References

Notes

 
Football
Football
Spain
Spain